The India women's national cricket team represents India in international women's cricket. A full member of the International Cricket Council (ICC), the team is governed by the Board of Control for Cricket in India (BCCI). The India women's national cricket team first competed in 1976 when they played the West Indies in a six-match Test series at home. They recorded their first victory in the fourth match held at the Moin-ul-Haq Stadium, Patna; however, a loss in the sixth match led to the series being tied. India secured their first overseas victory in a one-off series against South Africa in 2002. , they have played 38 Test matches against five different opponentsAustralia, England, South Africa, New Zealand and the West Indies. In terms of victories, they have been most successful against England and South Africa with two wins against each of them.

India played their first Women's One Day International cricket (WODI) match against England in the 1978 World Cup, which they hosted. They finished at the bottom of the table as they lost the remaining two games of the group stage. In the 1982 World Cup, they won their first ever WODI match when they beat the International XI by 79 runs at McLean Park, Napier. India's first overseas WODI series win came at the 1994–95 New Zealand Women's Centenary Tournament. They won the WODI series during their tour 1999 of England. They were the runner-up at the 2005 and the 2017 World Cup tournaments. , they have played 301 WODIs against twelve different opponents, and have the fourth highest number of victories (164) for any team in the format; They have recorded 81 wins and have been the fifth most successful team in the T20 format. Since their first Women's Twenty20 International (WT20I) against England in August 2006, India have played 151 matches. They have been most successful against Bangladesh with eleven wins against them. They were among the semi-finalists in the 2009 and 2010 ICC Women's World Twenty20 tournaments.

Key

Test cricket

One Day International

Twenty20 International

References

Cricket records and statistics
record by opponent